Robert Kelly (born 4 June 1936) is a New Zealand cricketer. He played in four first-class matches for Central Districts in 1961/62.

See also
 List of Central Districts representative cricketers

References

External links
 

1936 births
Living people
Central Districts cricketers
Cricketers from Dannevirke
New Zealand cricketers